Harry Johnson-Holmes (born 2 March 1997) is an Australian rugby union player who plays for the  in the Super Rugby competition, and has been capped for  in international rugby. His position of choice is prop.

Career

An injury to Tom Robertson in 2019 saw he start more regularly.

References

External links
 

Australia international rugby union players
Australian rugby union players
1997 births
Living people
Rugby union props
New South Wales Country Eagles players
New South Wales Waratahs players